Stevens Creek Reservoir is an artificial lake located in the foothills of the Santa Cruz Mountains near Cupertino, California.  A  county park surrounds the reservoir and provides limited fishing ("catch and release"), picnicking, hiking, and horseback riding activities. Although swimming is not allowed, non-power boating (such as a kayak) is allowed for certain parts of the year. No powered boats or jet skis are allowed. All vessels must be inspected for invasive Quagga mussels prior to launch.

The California Office of Environmental Health Hazard Assessment has issued a safe eating advisory for any fish caught in Stevens Creek Reservoir due to elevated levels of mercury.

History 
The reservoir was formed by the Stevens Creek Dam, built in 1935 across Stevens Creek.  It is one of the smaller reservoirs owned by the Santa Clara Valley Water District.

Originally named Arroyo de San José Cupertino, Stevens Creek flows into the reservoir and out of the dam to San Francisco Bay. Stevens Creek and the reservoir are named after  Captain Elijah Stephens who led the first wagon train across the Sierra Nevada in 1844 and settled in Cupertino.

Stevens Creek Dam 

Stevens Creek County Park 
Stevens Creek County Park is one of 28 Santa Clara County Parks.   The  park surrounds the reservoir, with the Picchetti Ranch Open Space Preserve adjacent to its east on the Montebello Ridge (also known as Black Mountain).  An entrance to the park lies three miles from Interstate 280.  Six miles of trails connect with the Midpeninsula Regional Open Space District's Fremont Older Open Space Preserve.

Fishing 
Bluegill, Koi, Common Carp, Largemouth Bass, Crappie, White Catfish, native landlocked Steelhead, and other species of fish live in the reservoir. A few illegally stocked White Sturgeon have even been caught as recently as 2021, including one weighing over 50lbs in 2010. It can be fished only with a permit unless under the age of 16.

While regulations permit the taking of fish, DFW recommends catch and release because of problems with the concentration of mercury and PCBs in the water. The reservoir was historically stocked with farmed Rainbow Trout for recreational purposes, but this practice was discontinued after elevated levels of Methylmercury were assessed. Fishing for trout at the reservoir is frowned upon since holdovers are likely endangered native Steelhead.

See also 

List of dams and reservoirs in California
List of lakes in California
List of lakes in the San Francisco Bay Area

References 

Embankment dams
Dams in California
Cupertino, California
Reservoirs in Santa Clara County, California
United States local public utility dams
Dams completed in 1935
Reservoirs in California
Reservoirs in Northern California
1935 establishments in California